On the Road With Austin & Santino is an American reality television series that aired on Lifetime. The series debuted on July 29, 2010, following the season premiere of Season 8 of Project Runway. Each episode aired after an episode of Project Runway. The series has since been cancelled and was not renewed for a second season.

Premise
On the Road with Austin & Santino follows fashion designers Austin Scarlett and Santino Rice as they travel to small towns around the United States and make a custom dress for a woman who has an upcoming special occasion. Each episode ends with Austin and Santino introducing their dress recipient at the event it was created for.

Series overview

References

External links
 IMDB page

2010 in fashion
2010s American reality television series
2010 American television series debuts
2010 American television series endings
Lifetime (TV network) original programming
US
Reality television spin-offs
Television series by The Weinstein Company
American television spin-offs